Cuiabá Esporte Clube, commonly referred to as Cuiabá, is a Brazilian professional club based in Cuiabá, Mato Grosso founded on 12 December 2001. It competes in the Campeonato Brasileiro Série A, the top flight of Brazilian football, as well as in the Campeonato Mato-Grossense, the top flight of the Mato Grosso state football league.

History
The club was founded on 12 December 2001 by former player Gaúcho, who was the manager in the club's amateur era. In 2003, they took part of their first professional tournament, the Campeonato Mato-Grossense, and lifted the trophy after defeating Barra do Garças in the finals.

Cuiabá also played in the 2003 Série C, being knocked out by Palmas. In 2004, the club again won the Mato-Grossense, but was knocked out in both the 2004 Copa do Brasil and 2004 Série C.

In December 2006, after a disappointing ninth position in the year's Mato-Grossense, Cuiabá closed their football department. The club only returned to an active status in 2009, after being acquired by the Grupo Dresch, and competed in the Campeonato Mato-Grossense Segunda Divisão, where they finished second and achieved promotion back to the top tier.

In 2011, Cuiabá lifted the Mato-Grossense after seven years. They also played in that year's Série D, and achieved promotion after finishing third. In the following year, they lost the Mato-Grossense on penalties to Luverdense, and managed to avoid relegation from the Série C.

The club won two consecutive Mato-Grossense titles in 2013 and 2014, and avoided relegation from the Série C. In 2014, the club left their stadium  and moved to the Arena Pantanal, built for the 2014 FIFA World Cup.

In 2015, Cuiabá won the greatest title in its history to date. After losing the first match to the Remo by 4–1, it obtained a historic turnaround and won by 5–1, obtaining the title of Copa Verde of that year. With the title, the club secured a place in the Copa Sudamericana the following year and participated for the first time in an international competition. Cuiabá was eliminated in the second round by Chapecoense.

In 2018 and 2019, Cuiabá won two consecutive Mato-Grossense titles without a single defeat, and was promoted to the Série B in 2019. In 2021, the club was promoted to the Série A for the first time in their history after finishing in 4th place, and became the first team from Mato Grosso to play in the first division since CEOV's participation in the 1986 edition.

Supporters
Since 2010 when Cuiabá began to invest more in its cast and was gaining prestige in its city earning local titles and having access to the third national division, quickly was gaining strength of the local press and of the inhabitants of the region, and with that strength increased very much their number of fans. In 2011 was founded its first organized fans, who had a reputation at all home games for being very festive, colorful and noisy.

Stadium

Cuiabá play their home games at Arena Pantanal. The stadium, which was built for the 2014 FIFA World Cup, has a maximum capacity of 42,968 people. Before the construction of the new stadium, the club played their home games at Estádio Eurico Gaspar Dutra, with a capacity of 4,500 people.

Rivalries
One of the biggest rivalries is against Luverdense. This game is considered to be the greatest derby in Mato Grosso today because the two teams are the largest forces in state football, as well as being a team match between the capital and the interior of Mato Grosso.

Another rival is the Mixto, who contest a local derby with Cuiabá.

Players

First team squad

Youth team

Out on loan

First-team staff

Honours
 Copa Verde
 Winners (2): 2015, 2019

 Campeonato Mato-Grossense
 Winners (11): 2003, 2004, 2011, 2013, 2014, 2015, 2017, 2018, 2019, 2021, 2022

 Copa FMF
 Winners (2): 2010, 2016

References

External links
 

Cuiabá Esporte Clube
Association football clubs established in 2001
Cuiabá
Cuiabá
2001 establishments in Brazil
Copa Verde winners